Letux is a municipality located in the Campo de Belchite comarca, province of Zaragoza, Aragon, Spain. According to the 2010 census, the municipality has a population of 425 inhabitants.

References

External links

Municipalities in the Province of Zaragoza